The Exception to the Rulers is a 2004 non-fiction book co-authored by American liberal journalists Amy and David Goodman. It reached number 12 in the New York Times Best Seller list for non-fiction paperbacks in 2005.

Contents 
 Introduction: The Silent Majority
1. Blowback
2. OILYgarchy
3. Drilling and Killing: Chevron and Nigeria’s Oil Dictatorship
4. Crackdown
5. Smackdown
6. Lockdown
7. Lies of Our Times
8. State Media, American Style
9. In Bed with the Military
10. Killing the Messenger
11. Sanitized
12. Going to Where the Silence Is
13. Not on Bended Knee
14. Psyops Comes Home
15. Things Get Messy with Sally Jessy
16. Hiroshima Cover-up: How the War Department’s Timesman won a Pulitzer
17. The People’s Airwaves
18. Conclusion: Free the Media

References

External links
"The following is an excerpt from the introduction" Excerpt

2004 non-fiction books
American non-fiction books